Dyo or DYO can be:

 Dyo, commune in the Saône-et-Loire department in the region of Bourgogne in eastern France
 Dyo, an English singer
 DYO Boya Fabrikaları, an İzmir, Turkey-based company founded at Bornova in 1954
 Dyo Potamoi, a small village in the Nicosia District of Cyprus
 Ptisi Gia Dyo, album by Greek singer Mando
 Eimaste Dyo, Eimaste Treis, Eimaste Hilioi Dekatreis!, a song by Mikis Theodorakis